Kvitretten (1991-2001 in Trondheim, Norway) was a Norwegian vocal group, known for improvisation and a cappella music releases, concerts, television shows, and international tours.

Biography 
Kvitretten was initially comprising arranger and composer Eldbjørg Raknes,  Kjersti Stubø (91-97), Tone Åse, Anna Sundström (91-94) and Hans Jørgen Støp (91-95). They were to be found at the festival «Nordlyd» 1993 with the commissioned work Ro u ro by Elin Rosseland, composer supported by Rikskonsertene. After some replacements, Raknes, Stubø, Åse and Kristin Asbjørnsen released the debut albumet Voices (1996) with lyrics by Raknes and Sidsel Endresen. They collaborated on the commissioned work Hysj by Lars Martin Myhre for «Vestfoldspillene» 1997, with a record released 1997, as well as on Vintersang (1998) by Odd Børretzen, and received Norsk Kulturråd's ensemble support 1997–99.

With Solveig Slettahjell replacing Stubø they released Everything turns (1999). Twenty-six texts by poet Torgeir Rebolledo Pedersen was performed as a commissioned work for Moldejazz 2000, and released on the album Kloden er en snurrebass som snurrer oss (2001). After touring in Germany, farewell concerts were held 2000–01.

Their music and arrangements has besides Raknes, been composed by Jon Balke, Elin Rosseland, Vigleik Storaas, Christian Wallumrød and Ståle Storløkken.

Discography

As Trondheim Voices 
1996: Voices (Curling Legs)
1999:Everything Turns (Curling Legs) 	
2002: Kloden er en snurrebass som snurrer oss (Curling Legs), lyrics by the poet Torgeir Rebolledo Pedersen

As backing 
1997: Hysj (Tylden & Co.), with Lars Martin Myhre
1998: Vintersang, with Odd Børretzen

References

External links 
Eldbjørg Raknes Website

Norwegian jazz singers
Musical groups established in 1991
1991 establishments in Norway
Musical groups from Trondheim